Rinard is a city in Calhoun County, Iowa, United States. The population was 38 at the time of the 2020 census.

History
Rinard was platted in 1904. The town soon became a key shipping point as it was located at the junction of the Chicago Great Western and the Fort Dodge, Des Moines & Southern railways.

Geography

Demographics

2010 census
At the 2010 census there were 52 people, 24 households, and 15 families living in the city. The racial makup of the city was 100.0% White.
Of the 24 households 33.3% had children under the age of 18 living with them, 58.3% were married couples living together, 4.2% had a female householder with no husband present, and 37.5% were non-families. 37.5% of households were one person and 20.8% were one person aged 65 or older. The average household size was 2.17 and the average family size was 2.80.

The median age was 46 years. 23.1% of residents were under the age of 18; 1.8% were between the ages of 18 and 24; 23.1% were from 25 to 44; 34.6% were from 45 to 64; and 17.3% were 65 or older. The gender makeup of the city was 50.0% male and 50.0% female.

2000 census
At the 2000 census there were 72 people, 28 households, and 18 families living in the city. The racial makup of the city was 100.00% White.
Of the 28 households 39.3% had children under the age of 18 living with them, 60.7% were married couples living together, 3.6% had a female householder with no husband present, and 35.7% were non-families. 35.7% of households were one person and 14.3% were one person aged 65 or older. The average household size was 2.57 and the average family size was 3.39.

The age distribution was 33.3% under the age of 18, 2.8% from 18 to 24, 29.2% from 25 to 44, 20.8% from 45 to 64, and 13.9% 65 or older. The median age was 36 years. For every 100 females, there were 105.7 males. For every 100 females age 18 and over, there were 128.6 males.

The median household income was $16,875 and the median family income  was $26,250. Males had a median income of $25,625 versus $13,125 for females. The per capita income for the city was $10,706. There were 26.7% of families and 27.4% of the population living below the poverty line, including 14.3% of under eighteens and 35.7% of those over 64.

Education
Rinard is served by the Prairie Valley Community School District, which formed on July 1, 1993 with the merger of the Cedar Valley Community School District and the Prairie Community School District.

References

External links

 
City-Data Comprehensive statistical data and more about Rinard

Cities in Calhoun County, Iowa
Cities in Iowa